Nicon is a genus of polychaetes belonging to the family Nereididae.

The species of this genus are found in Southern Hemisphere.

Species:

Nicon abyssalis 
Nicon aestuariensis 
Nicon japonicus

References

Polychaetes